The trampoline gymnastics events at the 2009 World Games in Kaohsiung was played between 20 and 22 July. 76 gymnasts , from 18 nations, participated in the tournament. The trampoline gymnastics competition took place at Kaohsiung Arena.

Participating nations

Medal table

Events

Men's events

Women's events

References

External links
 Fédération Internationale de Gymnastique
 Gymnastics on IWGA website
 Results

 
2009 World Games
World Games